Albert Lamppu (April 8, 1899 in Metsäpirtti – July 25, 1976) was a Finnish track and field athlete who competed in the 1928 Summer Olympics.

He was born in Metsäpirtti and died in Helsinki.

In 1928 he finished ninth in the javelin throw competition.

References
Sports Reference profile

1899 births
1976 deaths
People from Priozersky District
People from Viipuri Province (Grand Duchy of Finland)
Finnish male javelin throwers
Olympic athletes of Finland
Athletes (track and field) at the 1928 Summer Olympics